Wakestock was Europe's largest wakeboard music festival, combining the cultures of music and wakeboarding. It was held on the Llŷn Peninsula in Wales, in between Pwllheli and Llanbedrog.

Founded by Mark Durston, the festival began in Abersoch, north Wales back in 2000, when it was a wakeboard contest with a party in a car park for 800 people, and from then on played host to some of the industry's leading bands and DJs, along with the biggest wakeboard competition in Europe. In 2008 50% of the festival was sold to Kilimanjaro Live aka KiliLive.com. In 2010 the festival entered its second decade and become part of the World Wakeboard Series. After the 2010 festival founder Mark Durston took an exit to work on other projects with full ownership then taken on by Kilimanjaro Live.

The festival was split over three sites - the main festival site at Penrhos, Pwllheli Marina hosts the main wakeboard competition and Abersoch Bay hosts the Big Air Classic competition. The festival prides itself as being at the foot of the Snowdonia Mountains and looks out over Cardigan Bay.

The festival had its own wakeboard 'Pool Gap' that allows the wakeboarders to showcase the sport up on the festival site. The Pool Gap consisted of two pools containing a total of 200,000 gallons of water connected by street style handrails that the wakeboarders slid along whilst being towed by an overhead cable system.

In February 2015 it was announced on Twitter and Facebook that the festival would not be held that year, but would return for 2016. In 2016 the festival was cancelled again. Organisers said, "It isn’t necessarily the case that Wakestock will never happen again but a significant level of investment in terms of time and money will need to take place ... before any commitment takes place." As of 2017 there have been no further announcements and the official website has been closed.

Staging

Up until at least 2013 the festival had three stages. Originally these were called the "Open Air Stage", the "Misadventures Stage", and the "Relentless Stage". The names were later changed to West Stage, East Stage, and South Stage. Across all three stages there was a mixture of live bands and DJs.

2014 Line-up
This was the last festival to be held. Acts included: Tom Odell, Frank Turner, John Newman, Razorlight, Clean Bandit, Duke Dumont, Gorgon City, Frightened Rabbit, Ella Eyre, Catfish and the Bottlemen, Jess Glynne.

2013 Line-up
Included: Bastille, Rudimental, Example, Magnetic Man, James, Twin Atlantic, Wiley, The 1975, Wretch 32, Zane Lowe, Echo & the Bunnymen, Candelas, Huw Stevens, Catfish and the Bottlemen, Kids in Glass Houses, Yr Eira

2012 Line-up
The campsite opened from 1pm on Thursday 5 July. From 6pm the campers could attend the Wakestock pre-party if they had purchased a Thursday night arena pass for £10. They also needed to be in possession of a weekend camping, single day camping or vip weekend camping ticket. Nitro hosted the Thursday night pre-party with DJs Jaguar Skills, Nitro resident Jigsaw and Plastic Thumbs in the East Arena, doors opened from 6pm-12am.

On Thursday 19 July at 12.50am Channel 4 aired a programme showing the highlights of the festival.

2011 Line-up

2010 Acts

Friday 2 July

Open Air stage
Eric Prydz
 Fedde Le Grand
 Audio Bullys
 The Count & Sinden
 Bodyrox
 Zinc
 Dynamite MC
 Norman Jay
Kenneth Buttplug

 Misadventures Stage
N-Dubz
 Mr Hudson
 Wiley
 Roll Deep
 McLean
 Pretty Lights
 Mr Phormula

Relentless Live
 Skream
 Toddla T & MC Serocee
 Jakwob
 Plastic Thumbs
 Jigsaw vs Rocketman
 Ben Proudlove

Saturday 3 July

Open Air stage
Maxïmo Park
 Feeder
 Plan B
 The Last Republic
 Pete Lawrie

Misadventures Stage
Chase & Status
 Zane Lowe
 Tinie Tempah
 Ou Est Le Swimming Pool
 Kissy Sell Out
 Tim Lyall

Relentless Live
 Scratch Perverts
 Nervo
 Goldierocks
 Duke
 SBTRKT
 Micky Slim
 Gutterfunk DJs

Sunday 4 July

Open Air stage
 The Ting Tings
 The Futureheads
 Band Of Skulls
 Los Campesinos!
 Race Horses
 Polly Mackey and The Pleasure Principle
 Y Niwl

Misadventures Stage
 Pete Tong
 Robyn
 Sub Focus
 Alex Gaudino
 Fenech-Soler
 Nervo

Relentless Live
 The King Blues
 Huw Stephens
 Frankie & The Heartstrings
 Yr Ods
 Masters in France
 The Kickbacks

2009 Acts

Full list of acts as follows:

Friday

Open Air Stage
Moby
 Chicane
 James Zabiela
 Wally López
 Norman Jay
 Tim Lyall
 Brandon Block

XFM Stage
Calvin Harris
 Noisettes
 Tommy Sparks
 Kissy Sell Out
 Goldierocks
 Ebony Bones
 Lets Go To War
 Dirty Goods
 Flamboyant Bella

Relentless Pyramid stage
 Mr Scruff
 DJ Format
 Part Time Heroes
 Goldierocks
 DJ Play
 Emily Williams

Saturday

Open Air Stage
N*E*R*D
 Super Furry Animals
 Elliot Minor
 Sibrydion
 Gallops
 Ruth Kealy

XFM Stage
The Pigeon Detectives
 Fightstar
 The Joy Formidable
 Little Comets
 Spinnerette
 Chew Lips
 Haunts

Relentless Pyramid stage
 Chase & Status
 Goldie
 London Elektricity
 Gutterfunk DJs
 Tim Lyall
 James Condon
 Manipulate DJs
 Aled Mann

Sunday

Open Air Stage
Dizzee Rascal
 Zane Lowe
 Tinchy Stryder
 Red Light Company
 The Mission District
 Fran & Josh

XFM Stage
The Zutons
 Just Jack
 The Cuban Brothers
 Kid British
 Marina and the Diamonds
 Jett Black
 Yr Ods
 Lazy Boys

Relentless Pyramid stage
 Zane Lowe
 Huw Stephens
 Goldierocks
 Golden Silvers
 Young Fathers
 Pritchard Vs Dainton

2008 Acts

Full list of acts as follows:

Friday

Groove Armada
 Pendulum
 Hadouken!
 Audio Bullys
 Plump DJs
 Trophy Twins
 Nu-Mark (Jurassic 5)
 Friendly Fires
 Sam Sparro
 Josh Gabriel
 Royworld
 TY
 Part Time Heroes

Saturday

Mark Ronson
 Happy Mondays
 Funeral for a Friend
 Calvin Harris
 Elliot Minor
 Mystery Jets
 Operator Please
 The Blackout
 You Me At Six
 In Case Of Fire
 Norman Jay
 Jazzie B
 Brandon Block
 Genod Droog
 Kickbox Riot

Sunday

The Streets
 The Futureheads
 Young Knives
 Lightspeed Champion
 The Nextmen
 Duffy
 The Hoosiers
 One Night Only
 Zane Lowe
 DJ Yoda
 Metronomy
 The Dykeenies
 Russian Dolls

2007 Acts

Incomplete list of acts:

 Ferry Corsten
 Yousef
 Mark Ronson
 Just Jack and the Shapeshifters
 Dirty Pretty Things
 Get Cape, Wear Cape, Fly
 Brandon Block

Partners & Sponsors

Wakestock is involved with the local community and has partners from the surrounding area as well as some global names.

2010 partners list

Relentless
Malibu Boats
We7
Yamaha
Hyperlite
Jägermeister
British Army
RNLI

See also 
Wakestock (Canada)

References

External links

Wakestock information from BBC Wales

Festivals in Wales
Wakeboarding
Water sports in Wales
Recurring events established in 2000
2000 establishments in Wales
Llanbedrog
Water sports competitions
Summer events in Wales